Visa requirements for Guatemalan citizens are administrative entry restrictions by the authorities of other states placed on citizens of Guatemala. As of 2 July 2019, Guatemalan citizens had visa-free or visa on arrival access to 133 countries and territories, ranking the Guatemalan passport 39th in terms of travel freedom according to the Henley Passport Index.

Visa requirements map

Visa requirements

Visa requirements for holders of normal passports, and are traveling for tourist purposes:

Territories and disputed areas
Visa requirements for Guatemalan citizens for visits to various territories, disputed areas and restricted zones:

See also

Visa policy of Guatemala
Guatemalan passport

References and Notes
References

Notes

Guatemala
Foreign relations of Guatemala